Morzhegory is a rural locality (a village) in Morzhegorskoye Rural Settlement of Vinogradovsky District, Arkhangelsk Oblast, Russia. The population was 412 as of 2010. There are 3 streets.

Geography 
Morzhegory is located on the Severnaya Dvina River, 43 km northwest of Bereznik (the district's administrative centre) by road. Savinskaya is the nearest rural locality.

References 

Rural localities in Vinogradovsky District